The 1942 Saint Mary's Pre-Flight Air Devils football team represented the United States Navy pre-flight school at Saint Mary's College of California during the 1942 college football season. The team compiled a 6–3–1 record and outscored opponents by a total of 210 to 92.

Tex Oliver was the head coach. Two members of the team were named to the 1942 All-Navy All-America football team: Joe Ruetz at right guard and Frankie Albert at quarterback. In addition, Tom Smith (right guard) and Bob Koch (right halfback) were named to the 1942 All-Navy Preflight Cadet All-America team.

Schedule

References

St. Mary's Pre-Flight
Saint Mary's Pre-Flight Air Devils football seasons
Saint Mary's Pre-Flight Air Devils football